Boris Becker was the defending champion, but retired from his semifinals match this year.

Guy Forget won the title, defeating Andrei Cherkasov 6–3, 7–5, 3–6, 7–6 in the final.

Seeds

Draw

Finals

Top half

Bottom half

References

 Main Draw

1991 ATP Tour
Donnay Indoor Championships